Kaia Kanepi was the defending champion, but chose not to participate.

Jasmine Paolini won the title, defeating Diāna Marcinkēviča in the final, 6–2, 6–1.

Seeds

Draw

Finals

Top half

Bottom half

References

Main Draw

Internazionali Femminili di Brescia - Singles